Country Jam may refer to:

 Country Jam USA, annual country music festival held in Eau Claire, Wisconsin
 Country Jam (Colorado), annual country music festival held in Loma, Colorado